The Voice of Finland is a Finnish reality singing competition and local version of The Voice first broadcast as The Voice of Holland. The series premiered on Nelonen on 30 December 2011 and the first season concluded in April 2012. A second season started on 4 January 2013 and concluded on 26 April 2013. The series was further renewed for a third season, which premiered on 3 January 2014.

One of the important premises of the show is the quality of the singing talent. Four coaches, themselves popular performing artists, train the talents in their group and occasionally perform with them. Talents are selected in blind auditions, where the coaches cannot see, but only hear the auditioner.

The series is shot at the Logomo cultural venue in Turku.

Format 

The series consists of three phases: a blind audition, a battle phase, and live performance shows. Four judges/coaches, all noteworthy recording artists, choose teams of contestants through a blind audition process. Each judge has the length of the auditioner's performance (about one minute) to decide if he or she wants that singer on his or her team; if two or more judges want the same singer (as happens frequently), the singer has the final choice of coach.

Each team of singers is mentored and developed by its respective coach. In the second stage, called the battle phase, coaches have two of their team members battle against each other directly by singing the same song together, with the coach choosing which team member to advance from each of four individual "battles" into the first live round. Within that first live round, the surviving six acts from each team again compete head-to-head, with public votes determining one of two acts from each team that will advance to the final eight, while the coach chooses which of the remaining acts comprises the other performer remaining on the team.

In the final phase, the remaining contestants compete against each other in live broadcasts. The television audience and the coaches have equal say 50/50 in deciding who moves on to the semi-final. In the semi-final, the results are based on a mix of the public vote, advance vote on the previous week's performances, and voting of coaches. Each carries an equal weight of 100 points for a total of 300 points.

With one team member remaining for each coach, the final 4 contestants compete against each other in the finale with the outcome decided by the advance and the public vote, both with equal weight of 100 points for a total of 200 points.

Coaches' timeline

Series overview 
Warning: the following table presents a significant amount of different colors.

Coaches semifinalists and finalists
 – Winning coach & contestant. Winners are in bold, eliminated contestants in small font.

Season synopses

Season 1 (2011–12) 

The first season premiered on Nelonen on 30 December 2011 and the final was on 20 April 2012. The winner of the series was Mikko Sipola from coach Elastinen's team.

Season 2 (2013) 

The second season premiered on Nelonen on 4 January 2013, the final being broadcast on 26 April 2013. The winner of the second season was Antti Railio from Paula Koivuniemi's team.

For this season, The Voice of Finland introduced Kotivalmentaja (HomeCoach) mobile game for Apple iOS and Android phones.

Season 3 (2014) 

The third season premiered on Nelonen on 3 January 2014, the final being broadcast on 18 April 2014. The winner of the third season was Siru Airistola from Michael Monroe's team.

Season 4 (2015) 

The fourth season premiered on Nelonen on 2 January 2015. The winner of the fourth season was Miia Kosunen from Tarja Turunen's team.

Season 5 (2016) 

The fifth season premiered on Nelonen on 8 January 2016. The winner of the fifth season was Suvi Åkerman from Tarja Turunen's team.

Season 6 (2017) 

The sixth season premiered on Nelonen on 6 January 2017. The winner of the sixth season was Saija Saarnisto from Redrama's team.

Season 7 (2018) 
The seventh season premiered on Nelonen in January 2018. The winner of the seventh season was Jerkka Virtanen from Redrama's team.

Season 8 (2019) 
The eighth season premiered on Nelonen on January 2019. The winner of the eighth season was Markus Salo from Olli Lindholm's Team

Season 9 (2020)

Season 10 (2021)

Season 11 (2022)

Season 12 (2023)

Kids version 
The Voice Kids was a Finnish reality singing competition for contestants aged 8 to 14, based on the Dutch show of the same name. Serving as the children's version of The Voice of Finland, the competition proceeded as well as in the adult counterpart, with the Blind audition, the Battles and live performances, the semi-finals and finally the finals.

The coaches included The Voice of Finland coach Elastinen, PMMP's singer Mira Luoti and The Voice season 1 semi-finalist Krista Siegfrids. In season 2 Arttu Wiskari and Idols winner Diandra replaced Elastinen and Luoti.

The first season was won by 14-year-old Molly Rosenström. The second season was won by 13-year-old Aino Morko.

Coaches' timeline

Series overview

All-Stars version 

After the successful tenth anniversary season of The Voice of Finland, the show announced through Instagram and other social media platforms that they would be broadcasting an All-Star version in the autumn season. It is the second to acquire the rights after the French version. The show will be joined by former contestants from previous seasons.

Coaches' timeline

Series overview

Senior version

Coaches' timeline

Series overview

References

External links

 
Finnish television shows
2011 Finnish television series debuts
2010s Finnish television series
Finnish reality television series
Nelonen original programming
Finnish non-fiction television series